Lassy is the name of several communes in France:

Lassy, Ille-et-Vilaine, in the Ille-et-Vilaine département
Lassy, Calvados, in the Calvados département
Lassy, Val-d'Oise, in the Val-d'Oise département

People named Lassy:
Ivar Lassy (1889–1939), Finnish writer and anthropologist 
Timo Lassy (b. 1974), Finnish musician

See also 
 Lassi (disambiguation)
 Lassie (disambiguation)